Newnham is a small village and civil parish near Ashwell in the North Hertfordshire district, in the county of Hertfordshire, England. It shares a grouped parish council with neighbouring Caldecote, called Caldecote and Newnham Parish Council, although the two remain separate civil parishes.

The parish church is St Vincent's and features several medieval wall murals.

The solicitor and historian Reginald Hine (1883-1949) was born in Newnham Hall.

Statistics are not available for Newnham alone for the 2011 Census. Due to the small population of the parish and its neighbours, statistics are presented jointly for the three parishes of Caldecote, Newnham and Radwell, in order to protect individuals' privacy. The combined population of these three parishes was 209.

References

Sources
 British History Online: Newnham
 Vision of Britain: Newnham
 Vision of Britain: Newnham statistics

External links

Villages in Hertfordshire
Civil parishes in Hertfordshire
North Hertfordshire District